The Great Northern Railway J14 later Classified as J53 under LNER service was a 0-6-0 saddle tank  steam locomotive class of 52 built between 1892 and 1897.

The J14s were similar to the GNR Class J13 albeit with different boilers and without a steam dome and were built by Doncaster and Neilson and Co and designed by Patrick Stirling.

Sub Classes
17 J14s were built with Condensing equipment for the Metropolitan Railway while a further 10 had them retrofitted in 1900 all of these locomotives had extra lamp irons for Southern Railway running. These were later removed or added when the locomotives moved. Five J14s were rebuilt with G2 0-4-4 boilers four of these were rebuilt as J13s between 1928 and 1932 while No. 3928 was withdrawn in 1935.

References

External links 
 The Stirling J52 & J53 (GNR J13 & J14) 0-6-0ST Locomotives LNER Encyclopedia

J13
0-6-0ST locomotives
Railway locomotives introduced in 1892
Standard gauge steam locomotives of Great Britain
Shunting locomotives